Denis Istomin was the defending champion but lost in the final to Konstantin Kravchuk.

Kravchuk won the title defeating Istomin 7–5, 6–4 in the final.

Seeds

Draw

Finals

Top half

Bottom half

References
Main Draw
Qualifying Draw

Tashkent Challenger - Singles